Spencerville High School is a public high school located in Spencerville, Ohio in Allen County, Ohio.

Background
Spencerville High School first graduated a class in 1888.

References

External links
 District Website

High schools in Allen County, Ohio
Public high schools in Ohio
1888 establishments in Ohio